Mulji Jetha Fountain is a listed heritage structure in Fort, Mumbai that was erected in 1894, following a commission by Ruttonsee Mulji, a cotton merchant who sought to commemorate the death of his only son, Dharamsi Mulji, who died aged 15 in 1889. The statue of a boy on top holding a book represents the son who loved reading. The drinking fountain was designed by architect Frederick William Stevens (who also designed the Victoria Terminus), and he was assisted by John Griffiths, the then principal of Sir Jamsetjee Jeejebhoy School of Art. 

The structure is built in Indo-Saracenic style and the carvings employ many Indian motifs. Elephant heads have been used as corbels and water spouts are rendered in the shape of animal heads. After decades of neglect, the fountain was restored in 2017 with funds raised by the Kala Ghoda Association. The plumbing was restored as well to make it functional again.

References

Fountains in Mumbai
1894 sculptures
Buildings and structures completed in 1894
Stone sculptures
Drinking fountains
Outdoor sculptures in India